Greenwich Town hall is a municipal building on Royal Hill, Greenwich, London. It is a Grade II listed building.

History

The building was commissioned to replace the old town hall in Greenwich High Road which had served as the headquarters for the Greenwich District Board of Works before becoming the home of the Metropolitan Borough of Greenwich in 1900. After the old town hall had become inadequate for the council's needs, civic leaders decided to build a new town hall: the site chosen for the new building had previously been occupied by the old Greenwich Theatre.

The foundation stone for the new building was laid by the mayor, Councillor Harold Gibbons, on 18 June 1938. The new building was designed by Clifford Culpin in the Art Deco style, built by William Moss & Sons and was completed in 1939. The design involved an asymmetrical main frontage with eleven bays facing onto Royal Hill; the central section had a doorway on the ground floor and there was a window on the first floor with the borough coat of arms above; there was a smaller window on the second floor. The principal rooms in the complex included the council chamber itself. At the foot of the tower was a doorway with a canopy showing the signs of the zodiac to a design by Carter & Co. 

The south east wing of the building contained an assembly hall known as the Borough Hall. Sir Nikolaus Pevsner wrote that Greenwich Town Hall, which shows the influence of Hilversum Town Hall in the Netherlands, was "the only town hall of any London borough to represent the style of our time adequately". 

The building remained the headquarters of the Metropolitan Borough of Greenwich until the borough was merged with the Metropolitan Borough of Woolwich to form the London Borough of Greenwich, with its new local seat of government at Woolwich Town Hall, in 1965.

After the town hall ceased to be the local seat of government, it was extensively altered to create floors in the area of the council chamber in 1974. Renamed Meridian House, to reflect the fact that the prime meridian goes through Greenwich, it became the home of GSM London at that time.

Meanwhile, the Borough Hall was used as a concert venue: the rock band Squeeze gave their first performance there in 1975, as commemorated by a blue plaque on the side of the building. The Borough Hall went on to become the home of Greenwich Dance from 1993 until the organisation moved out in 2018.

References

Government buildings completed in 1939
City and town halls in London
Grade II listed buildings in the Royal Borough of Greenwich
Grade II listed government buildings